David J. Cohen, also known as "Coney Island Dave Cohen" (born 1951), is an actor and sportscaster.

Education
He attended Stuyvesant High School and Syracuse University, graduating in 1972.

Career

Actor
He has appeared in HBO's Eastbound and Down series; films like Glory Road; Trouble with the Curve; Ruffian; and Amy & Isabelle. He also appeared as a sportscaster in an episode of One Tree Hill.

TV Sportscaster
He was also a TV and Radio sportscaster, most notably with the New York Yankees on MSG Network and for three decades as an ESPN freelance play-by-play talent. Debuting in 1979 on ESPN he announced men's and women's college basketball; college football; lacrosse; soccer; boxing; wrestling; track and field; college baseball; softball and crew racing. He was the creator and original host of Mets Extra in 1986 and 87; an ABC Radio Network sports anchor; producer and announcer on Costas Coast-to-Coast as well as Jim McKay's Thoroughbred Connection. His TV anchoring includes WSYR and WIXT; WABC-TV and Fox Sports South in Atlanta where he also did Atlanta Braves hosting and play-by-play.

Radio
At WSB radio he was the Braves pre and post-game host as well as a sportstalk host. Dave Cohen was also a topical promo voice of CNN; an image voice for NASCAR; and an NBA TV play-by-play voice of the Washington Bullets. His voice has appeared on hundreds of commercials and infomercials.

Awards
He won an Emmy Award in 1996 for his commentary on Dwight Gooden's no-hitter.

Personal life
Cohen is married to Kathleen. He currently lives in Atlanta, Georgia.

References

External links

Living people
American television sports announcers
American radio sports announcers
American television sports anchors
College football announcers
College basketball announcers in the United States
Major League Baseball broadcasters
Atlanta Braves announcers
New York Yankees announcers
Syracuse Orange football announcers
Television personalities from New York City
Male actors from Syracuse, New York
Male actors from Atlanta
Boxing commentators
Lacrosse announcers
1951 births
Television personalities from Syracuse, New York